Martin L. Keyes (born February 19, 1850) founded the Keyes Fibre Company in 1903.

Obtained a patent for a paper-plate making machine.  Defended the patent.  The plates were later branded "Chinet", and the company is currently owned by Huhtamäki.

References

19th-century American people
1850 births
Year of death missing
People from Lempster, New Hampshire